Angelo Moratti (5 November 1909 – 12 August 1981) was an Italian oil tycoon and the former owner of Inter Milan from 1955 to 1968.

Biography
In 1962, after a long history in the oil business, Moratti founded Saras S.p.A., an energy multinational corporation with operations in petroleum refining, marketing, transportation, and power generation.

In 1955, he became the owner and chairman of Serie A football club Internazionale Milano F.C. Under his ownership and Helenio Herrera's coaching, Inter thrived, earning the nickname of Grande Inter for their national and international success. Angelo Moratti was the second most victorious owner in the history of the club, behind his son Massimo who owned the club from 1995 to 2004 and from 2006 to 2013.

References

External links
Angelo Moratti at Treccani 

1909 births
1981 deaths
Italian football chairmen and investors
Inter Milan chairmen and investors